Suslovo is a rural locality (a selo) and the administrative centre of Suslovsky Selsoviet, Birsky District, Bashkortostan, Russia. The population was 647 as of 2010. There are 13 streets.

Geography 
Suslovo is located 12 km east of Birsk (the district's administrative centre) by road. Desyatkino is the nearest rural locality.

References 

Rural localities in Birsky District